Martina Goričanec (born 19 September 1993) is an Austrian handballer who plays for LC Brühl Handball and the Austria national team.

International honours
EHF Cup Winners' Cup:
Semifinalist: 2015

References

1993 births
Living people
People from Feldkirch, Vorarlberg
Austrian female handball players
Expatriate handball players
Austrian expatriate sportspeople in Switzerland
Austrian people of Croatian descent
Sportspeople from Vorarlberg